Fiordland is a geographic region of New Zealand. 

Fiordland may also refer to:

Places
 Fiordland National Park, in Fiordland region of New Zealand
 Fiordland College, a school in Te Anau, New Zealand
 Fiordland Conservancy, a provincial park in British Columbia, Canada

Animal species
Animal species named after the Fiordland region of New Zealand:
 Fiordland brotula (Fiordichthys slartibartfasti)
 Fiordland penguin (Eudyptes pachyrhynchus)
 Fiordland skink (Oligosoma acrinasum)
 Fiordlandia, a genus in the family Hydractiniidae

See also
 
 Fjordland, a Norwegian food manufacturer
 Fjord (disambiguation)